Crook's Tour is a 1941 black and white British film directed by John Baxter featuring Charters and Caldicott. It is adapted from a BBC radio serial of the same name.

Plot
Charters and Caldicott are touring the Middle East (Saudi Arabia) with fellow Britons. After their vehicle breaks down they meet a caravan and a local sheikh invites them to dinner. After a glass of wine the sheikh offers to lend them two camels and tells of his fears that someone is spying on his oilfield.

They return to Baghdad where they go to a night club. Here two spies are expected and a Mata Hari type figure (the glamorous La Palermo) delivers a note (hidden on a record) to them in error, because they order exactly what the true spies are meant to order (as a code). When the real spies arrive (two Americans) and make the same order the mistake is realised.

Meanwhile our two heroes are flying to Istanbul. Here they are directed to a false hotel. La Palermo is to sing there to let them know something is up. They plan to kill the pair. They put them in a room with a booby trap bathroom... just a large hole dropping into the Bosporus. Charters slaps someone on the back, believing it to be Caldicott, and he falls in. Fearing reprisal for this accidental death they catch a plane to Budapest. Charters' sister Edith arrives in Budapest and struggles to track their hotel. La Palermo breaks into Caldicott's room to try to find the record. The next evening they track down La Palermo singing in a local night club, singing "Gypsy Lover".

The pair give the record to an English contact but are astounded when he says he does not play cricket.

They take a train eastwards to the edge of Hungary. They climb to a hilltop castle where La Palermo is. They are caught and are shot by firing squad, but La Palermo has organised blanks in the guns and they all escape together. A driver rushes all three to an airport then they take a boat across the Adriatic before going back to London. La Palermo kisses Caldicott as their train approaches London.

Cast
 Basil Radford as Charters
 Naunton Wayne as Caldicott
 Greta Gynt as La Palermo
 Charles Oliver as Sheik
 Gordon McLeod as Rossenger
 Abraham Sofaer as Ali
 Bernard Rebel as Klacken
 Cyril Gardiner as K.7. 
 Leo de Pokorny as Hotel Manager
 Morris Harvey as Waiter
 Noel Hood as Edith Charters
 Finlay Currie as Tourist (uncredited) 
 Andreas Malandrinos as Nightclub Manager (uncredited)
 Patricia Medina as Hotel Receptionist (uncredited)
 Jack Melford as Tour Guide (uncredited)

Availability
The film is available as a supplement on The Lady Vanishes Criterion Collection DVD and Blu-ray.

References

External links
 
 
 

1941 films
1941 comedy films
1940s English-language films
British black-and-white films
British comedy films
British spy comedy films
Films set in Baghdad
Films shot at British National Studios
1940s British films